Abertzaleen Batasuna (AB;  or Unity) is a Basque political party in France.

Ideology
It is the largest Basque nationalist party of the French Basque Country gathering around 10% of the votes in this territory. Its immediate goal is the establishment of a Pays Basque département out of Pyrénées-Atlantiques. In terms of ideology, besides Basque nationalist, it is a leftist political party.

History
It was founded as an electoral platform and in 2001 it was redesigned as a political party. In 2001, members of AB who desired a stronger link to Southern Basques left to form the Northern branch of Batasuna, a different party with a similar ideology which is now illegal in Spain.

AB neither justifies nor condemns the violence of ETA, calling instead for a truce. ETA has scolded AB for this lack of support from what is seen as a friendly organization.

The opinion newspaper most related to AB is Enbata.

See also

Herritarren Zerrenda
Iparretarrak
List of political parties in France

References

2001 establishments in France
Basque nationalism
Left-wing nationalist parties
Nationalist parties in France
Political parties established in 2001
Political parties in Northern Basque Country
Secessionist organizations in Europe
Separatism in France
Socialist parties in France